El tesoro de la isla Maciel (The Treasure of Maciel Island) is a 1941 Argentine comedy film directed by Manuel Romero.

Production

The 73-minute black and white Lumiton film was directed and written by Manuel Romero.
It is an adaptation of a popular stage play.
Music is by Rodolfo Sciammarella and cinematography by Hugo Chiesa.
The film was released in Argentina on 8 July 1941.
It stars Luis Arata, Severo Fernández and Alberto Bello.

Synopsis

A retired sea captain is profoundly bored. His sons hope to wake him up by staging a fake treasure hunt.
This turns into a difficult journey to the Río de la Plata islands.
The family are unaware that their backyard holds a valuable oil well.
The farce is fast-paced, only slightly hampered by a romantic subplot.

Reception

El Mundo said the film achieved some popular comic effect. Although void of any cinematographic merit, the dynamism of its action could not be denied.
The show was amusing. Manrupe and Portela said of the film that it was a simple work derived from a farce, but there were some moments of humor from a runaway Luis Arata and an insufferable Severo Fernández.
Another critic called the film puerile and verbose.

Cast
The cast included:

 Luis Arata as Lorenzo García
 Severo Fernández as Juan Tunín
 Alberto Bello as Captain Pedro Santini
 Silvana Roth as María Santini
 Juan Mangiante as Bianchi
 Alfredo Jordan as Alejandro
 María Armand as Antonia Santini
 Gerardo Rodríguez as Doctor Carlos Juárez
 Cayetano Biondo as Professor Curot
 Fernando Campos as manager of a shipping company
 Jimmy Hart as American engineer

References
Citations

Sources

External links

1941 films
1940s Spanish-language films
Argentine black-and-white films
Argentine comedy films
1941 comedy films
Films directed by Manuel Romero
Argentine films based on plays